Typhoon Cora, known in the Philippines as Typhoon Ibiang was a moderately strong typhoon that caused significant impacts in Japan and the Caroline Islands during the 1969 Pacific typhoon season. Tropical Depression 09W formed on August 12, 1969, 2 days after Typhoon Betty (Huling) dissipated. The depression intensified into Tropical Storm Cora on August 14 and had later intensified into Typhoon Cora 4 days later. Cora made landfall in the Ryukyu Islands on August 19 right after the storm intensified into Category 2 status. Okinawa Island received minor damage. After making landfall in Kyushu–Honshu, Cora transitioned into a extratropical state and finished on August 21. Cora dissipated on August 23, 1969.

Meteorological history 
At 6:00 UTC, on August 12, 1969, the Joint Typhoon Warning Center began to monitor a tropical depression that had formed north of the Caroline Islands. Then the tropical storm was given the name Cora. Tropical Storm Cora traveled into the Philippine Area of Responsibility and was designated as Tropical Storm Ibiang on August 16 at 23:00 UTC.

Soon after, Cora began to make a definite eye formation and finished the same day. Honshū received a downpour of rain from Typhoon Cora.

Cora then began to transition into a extratropical state. Typhoon Cora finished on August 21 at 16:00 UTC. After crossing Honshū and producing rain, Cora dissipated near Hokkaidō on August 23 at 05:00 UTC. Cora was the only typhoon that had impacted Japan that season and the second tropical cyclone to impact Japan before Severe Tropical Storm Alice.

Preparations and impact 
Before Typhoon Cora made landfall, there were up to 34 warnings and 15 of those were at typhoon intensity by the Joint Typhoon Warning Center and the Japan Meteorological Agency. As a tropical depression, Cora brought rainfall over the Caroline Islands, one of them being the Woleai Atoll. 

After intensifying into a Category 2 typhoon, Typhoon Cora struck the Ryukyu Islands with heavy rain and caused families within low-lying coasts to flee. After causing minor damage, Typhoon Cora then killed one person and 37 people on the island of Okinawa on August 19. Before Cora's dissipation on the 23 of August, Cora left hundreds without homes and left police to help recover for the damage. Cora had also brought rain up to Hokkaidō and Honshū before it dissipated on August 23.

See also 

 1969 Pacific typhoon season

References

External links 

www.metoc.navy.mil
www.jma.go.jp
An article about Typhoon Cora's structure.

1969 Pacific typhoon season
Typhoons in Japan